Mutual relations between the Republic of Belarus and the European Union (EU) were initially established after the European Economic Community recognised Belarusian independence in 1991.

After Alexander Lukashenko became Belarusian leader in 1994, the relationship between Minsk and the EU deteriorated and has remained cold and distanced, as the EU has condemned the government of Belarus several times for authoritarian and anti-democratic practices, and even imposed sanctions on the country. 

Following a slight improvement in relations in 2008, the 2010 Belarusian presidential election (which officially saw a landslide victory of almost 80% for Lukashenko), led to mass demonstrations and arrests in Minsk. The EU declared that the imprisonment of opposition figures and protesters contravened human rights laws, and imposed new targeted sanctions on major Belarusian officials and businesspeople.

Belarus is participating in the EU's Eastern Partnership. In October 2015, the EU announced it would suspend most of its sanctions against Belarus. Belarus borders three EU member states: Poland, Lithuania and Latvia.

History
European Economic Commission recognised Belarusian independence in 1991, and Belarus is part of several bilateral and multilateral treaties with the European Union. In 1995, Belarus and the European Union signed a Partnership and Cooperation Agreement, but this agreement was not ratified by the EU. Belarus is a member of trade relations agreements based on the EU Generalized System of Preferences and the Most favoured nation. Belarus is also a part of the EU's Eastern Partnership.

Belarus-EU relationships began to worsen after the election of Alexander Lukashenko in 1994, with Belarus excluded from the EU's European Neighbourhood Policy as the EU's reaction towards the establishment of an authoritarian regime under President Lukashenko.

The deterioration of Belarus-EU relationships continued in the 21st century, with the European Union imposing sanctions against Belarusian officials, businessmen and several government-owned companies. The sanctions were the results of political repression following mass protests during the 2010 presidential elections, when several members of the political opposition and protesters were imprisoned and condemned to prison terms.

There are notes of Belarus-EU relations' improvement. Belarus has not supported Russia in its aggression towards Ukraine, and released several political prisoners. In 2015, the EU suspended most of the sanctions against Belarusian officials. In 2016 the travel ban imposed on Lukashenko in 2000 was lifted. This decision was praised by Belarusian officials. Yet, as noted by both EU officials and international organisations, further improvement has slowed due to ongoing human rights violations and suppression of political opposition that are still present in Belarus. 

In 2019, Lukashenko made his first official visit to the European Union since sanctions ended. The EU's Eastern Partnership program and further economic initiatives were discussed in Lukashenko's meeting with Austria's Sebastian Kurz.

In 2016, two opposition candidates were elected to Belarus' parliament. This was marked as a step to democratisation by several EU officials.

The visa system is functioning between the EU and Belarus, with Schengen visas required for Belarusians wishing to entry the European Union. Belarus introduced a visa-free entry for citizens of 70 countries including the EU in 2017. In 2019, it was announced that the EU would simplify requirements for obtaining Schengen visas for Belarusians, reducing its costs and time needed for application approval.

Belarus-EU relations are complicated by the stronger Belarusian ties with Russia, who emerged as active EU critic and opponent after the annexation of Crimea in 2014. Belarus is a part of the Belarus-Russia Union State, as well as the European-Asian Union, a customs union which includes both countries and several other CIS-members. As of today, the Belarus-Russia integration is mostly economic, with free trade and free movement zones established between the two countries, but Russia is being seen as demanding deeper political and administrative integration.

In 2021, Ryanair flight 4978 from Greece to Lithuania (both EU members) was forced to land in Minsk by the Belarusian Air Force. The flight was less than 10 km from its destination but still in Belarusian air space. Two passengers, journalist Roman Protasevich, who had published negative comments about the Belarusian government, and his girlfriend Sofia Sapega, were taken and arrested by authorities and the plane was allowed to depart 7 hours later. EU members unanimously condemned the action and began to discuss possible responses. 

As a response by the EU to the incident, Belarusian airliners have been banned from flying over the EU's airspace and from using any airport of the 27 countries that are members of the bloc.

Later in 2021, Belarusian athlete Krystsina Tsimanouskaya applied for asylum in a number of European Union countries after Belarusian officials tried to force her onto a plane at Tokyo's airport. At the airport, airport police stopped the repatriation and took her to a safe area at the airport. She was able to fly to Poland after they gave her a humanitarian visa.

In February 2022, Belarus allowed Russian forces to stage part of the invasion of Ukraine from Belarusian territory. The EU imposed new sanctions on Belarus in response.

Legal framework 
Although the European Union and Belarus signed a Partnership and Cooperation Agreement (PCA) in 1995, which was intended to govern the mutual political and economic relations, this agreement was not ratified by the EU. Furthermore, the European Union has excluded Belarus from its European Neighbourhood Policy (ENP), which was originally designed to establish a "ring of friends" in the Union's geographical proximity. Brussels has claimed this exclusion to be a direct response to the establishment of an authoritarian regime under President Lukashenko.

However, EU–Belarus trade relations are still covered by the Union's Generalised System of Preferences and the most favoured nation (MFN) provisions of the 1989 Agreement between the EU and the Soviet Union. Belarus is amongst the few states in Europe that have not asked for membership in the European Union. Similarly, the European Union has not offered membership to Minsk. Belarus has continuously sought to further its economic and political ties with Russia, being one of the founding members of the Union State (formerly the 'Union State of Russia and Belarus').

In October 2009, a poll conducted by the independent NISEPI institute in Belarus found that 44.1 percent of the Belarusian people would vote Yes in a referendum to join the EU, compared to 26.7 percent one year earlier. Local experts are linking the swing to more pro-EU messages in Belarusian state media, Polish daily Rzeczpospolita says.

On October 30, 2015, it was announced that the EU would suspend most of its sanctions against Belarus, following the freeing of the country's political prisoners in August.

Following a series of mass protests that took place after a disputed presidential election in August 2020, EU High Representative for Foreign Affairs and Security Policy Josep Borrell announced that the EU would bring in sanctions against Belarusian officials responsible for "violence and falsification". Charles Michel, President of the European Council went further on 19 August saying the EU would soon impose sanctions on a “substantial number” of individuals responsible for violence, repression, and election fraud.

See also 
 Foreign relations of the European Union
 Foreign relations of Belarus
 List of people and organizations sanctioned in relation to human rights violations in Belarus
 INOGATE

References

External links 
 Current analysis of Belarus-EU relations on Belarus Digest
 Changing Belarus (Chaillot Paper No.85) European Union Institute for Security Studies
 Back from the Cold? The EU and Belarus in 2009 (Chaillot Paper No.119) European Union Institute for Security Studies
 Belarusian News in english
 European partnership is one of external landmarks for Belarus  Deutsche Welle (English version)
 Victor Shadurski (FPS): Belarus should develop economic and political ties with the EU First National Channel (Belarus) (English version)
 Kiryl Kascian. Belarus-EU Relations: Ad Hoc Actions vs. Pre-developed Strategy, Belarusian Review Working Paper, #2, November 2014

 
Contemplated enlargements of the European Union
Third-country relations of the European Union
EU